Castara is a seaside village on the leeward (north) coast of the island of Tobago, the smaller of the two islands in the twin-island Republic of Trinidad and Tobago.  Castara's economy is dependent primarily on fishing and agriculture, with tourism playing an increasingly important role since the 1990s.

Former prime minister and president of Trinidad and Tobago A.N.R. Robinson was raised in Castara.

Climate

References

Populated places in Tobago
Villages in Trinidad and Tobago